KFLL-LD, virtual and UHF digital channel 25, is a low-powered Visión Latina-owned-and-operated television station licensed to Boise, Idaho, United States. The station is owned by the DTV America Corporation  subsidiary of HC2 Holdings.

The station's transmitter is located at a point west of Mountain Home.

Digital channels
The station's digital signal is multiplexed:

References

External links

Innovate Corp.
FLL-LD
Television channels and stations established in 2014
2014 establishments in Idaho